The 2001 Sharpie 500 was the 24th stock car race of the 2001 NASCAR Winston Cup Series and the 41st iteration of the event. The race was held on Saturday, August 25, 2001, in Bristol, Tennessee at Bristol Motor Speedway, a 0.533 miles (0.858 km) permanent oval-shaped racetrack. The race took the scheduled 500 laps to complete. At race's end, Tony Stewart, driving for Joe Gibbs Racing, would control the late stages of the race to win his 12th career NASCAR Winston Cup Series victory and his third and final victory of the season. To fill out the podium, Kevin Harvick, driving for Richard Childress Racing, and Jeff Gordon, driving for Hendrick Motorsports, would finish second and third, respectively.

Background 

The Bristol Motor Speedway, formerly known as Bristol International Raceway and Bristol Raceway, is a NASCAR short track venue located in Bristol, Tennessee. Constructed in 1960, it held its first NASCAR race on July 30, 1961. Despite its short length, Bristol is among the most popular tracks on the NASCAR schedule because of its distinct features, which include extraordinarily steep banking, an all concrete surface, two pit roads, and stadium-like seating. It has also been named one of the loudest NASCAR tracks.

Entry list 

 (R) denotes rookie driver.
 (i) denotes driver who is ineligible for series driver points.

Practice

First practice 
The first practice session was held on Friday, August 24, at 11:30 AM EST. The session would last for two hours.

Second and final practice 
The second and final practice session, sometimes referred to as Happy Hour, was held on Friday, August 24, at 5:45 PM EST. The session would last for one hour and 30 minutes.

Qualifying 
Qualifying was held on Friday, August 24, at 3:00 PM EST. Each driver would have two laps to set a fastest time; the fastest of the two would count as their official qualifying lap. Positions 1-36 would be decided on time, while positions 37-43 would be based on provisionals. Six spots are awarded by the use of provisionals based on owner's points. The seventh is awarded to a past champion who has not otherwise qualified for the race. If no past champ needs the provisional, the next team in the owner points will be awarded a provisional.

Full qualifying results

Race results

References 

2001 NASCAR Winston Cup Series
NASCAR races at Bristol Motor Speedway
August 2001 sports events in the United States
2001 in sports in Tennessee